Bank of Beirut (Arabic: بنك بيروت, not to be confused with Bank of Beirut and the Arab Countries) is a commercial bank in Beirut, Lebanon. Bank of Beirut was founded in 1963 as Realty Business Bank S.A.L. and in 1970, changed its name to the current name. In 1993, a group of bankers and businessmen headed by Salim Sfeir, the current Chairman and CEO, acquired the five-branch bank, which ranked 35 out of the 71 banks operating that year, and in 1997, Bank of Beirut was listed on the Beirut Stock Exchange..

Acquisition history 
The 1990s was a significant decade for the bank when it started acquiring other banks to boost its own presence;

Expansion 

In 1997, a strategic alliance was formed with Emirates NBD; later in 2001 Bank of Beirut opened a representative office in Dubai to serve expatriates in the GCC.  In 2002, a branch was opened in Limassol, Cyprus regulated by the Central Bank of Cyprus, followed by the opening of a representative office in Lagos, Nigeria in 2004 and in Accra.  3 branches opened in Oman, Sohar in 2008 (closed), Ghobra in 2012, and The Wave in 2014 (closed).
In 2002, Bank of Beirut (UK) Ltd, a fully owned subsidiary, was established, which opened a branch in Frankfurt, Germany in 2009 (and closed in 2019) and following the acquisition of Bank of Sydney in 2011, branches opened in Adelaide (closed)and Melbourne, in addition to Sydney.

Offices and branches 
Bank of Beirut currently operates 90 branches across 4 continents that include over 61 branches in Lebanon, 10 branches across Sydney, Melbourne, and Adelaide in Australia, 1 branch in Oman, United Kingdom, Cyprus, and representative offices in Nigeria.

BoB Finance (Western Union agent) 
BoB Finance S.A.L is a Lebanese P2P payments and money transfer company based in Lebanon with headquarters in Horsh Tabet, Beirut. BoB Finance money transfer services businesses are divided into two categories: International and Local Money Transfers and Governmental bill payments. The company provides its service to individuals and businesses through a network of agents and financial institutions.

In 2020, BoB Finance was the second largest provider of money transfers in Lebanon. The company operates in more than 200 cities with a network of about 700 agent offices. 

BoB Finance is a financial institution owned by Bank of Beirut and licensed by the Central Bank of Lebanon.In 2009, BoB Finance was appointed as Western Union's agent to provide services such as domestic and international transfers. With over 700 sub-agents across the country, BoB Finance provides key services such as remittances, bill payments, mobile top-ups, and payment facilities for flydubai and corporate cash collection.

BoB Finance participated in helping distribute relief aid following the 2020 Beirut Blast by removing their fees on remittances coming from abroad.  

The company has also contributed to other philanthropic efforts with numerous NGOs and INGOs https://www.bob-finance.com/Inside/InsidePages/C2B. 

In 2022, the company participated in the Beirut Marathon in support of Idraac

https://www.idraac.org/idraac/homepage and mental health.

BoB Finance FinTech (2022–present)

In June 2022, BoB Finance utilized their integrated payment solutions and cross-border remittance services to develop their FinTech arm. This venture allowed the use of eWallet services, allowing consumers to send real-time remittances to family and friends around Lebanon through a number of applications and more than 700 walk in locations.

Board of directors

See also 

Beirut Stock Exchange
Economy of Lebanon

 List of Banks in Lebanon
 Banque du Liban
 Intercontinental Bank of Lebanon (IBL)
 Lebanon and Gulf Bank
 Saradar Bank
 Lebanon and Gulf Bank

References

Other references 
 http://www.ameinfo.com/financial_markets/Lebanon/Company_LB0001/
 http://www.lebweb.com/site/lebanon-bankofbeirut-lb-40855
 http://www.transnationale.org/companies/bank_beirut.php

External links 
BoB Lebanon Website
Bank of Sydney (BoB Subsidiary)
Bank of Beirut Oman
Bank of Beirut UK
Bank of Beirut Cyprus

Banks of Lebanon
Banks established in 1963
Lebanese brands
Companies based in Beirut
Companies listed on the Beirut Stock Exchange